Oberea herzi is a species of beetle in the family Cerambycidae. It was described by Ganglbauer in 1887.

References

herzi
Beetles described in 1887